The rigaudon, anglicized as rigadon or rigadoon, is a French baroque dance with a lively duple metre.  The music is similar to that of a bourrée, but the rigaudon is rhythmically simpler with regular phrases (eight measure phrases are most common). It originated as a sprightly 17th-century French folk dance for couples. Traditionally, the folkdance was associated with the provinces of Vivarais, Languedoc, Dauphiné, and Provence in southern France, and it became popular as a court dance during the reign of Louis XIV. Its hopping steps were adopted by the skillful dancers of the French and English courts, where it remained fashionable through the 18th century. By the close of the 18th century, however, it had given way in popularity as a ballroom dance (along with the passepied, bourrée, and gigue) to the minuet.

Sources

Further reading

  
   
 
 

Baroque dance
French dances
Dance forms in classical music